The Calgary Roughnecks are a lacrosse team based in Calgary playing in the National Lacrosse League (NLL). The 2016 season was the 15th in franchise history.

Final standings

Game log

Regular season

Playoffs

Transactions

Trades

Entry Draft
The 2015 NLL Entry Draft took place on September 28, 2015. The Roughnecks made the following selections:

See also
2016 NLL season

References

Calgary
Calgary Roughnecks seasons
Calgary Roughnecks